Death Scream is a 1975 American made-for-television crime drama film loosely based on an actual event concerning the real-life account of "a young woman whose murder was witnessed by fifteen of her neighbors who did nothing to help and refused to cooperate with the police." It originally aired on ABC on September 26, 1975.

The film had the working title of Homicide, and its rerun title was The Woman Who Cried Murder.

Premise
On March 13, 1964, Catherine "Kitty" Genovese was attacked and viciously stabbed several times by a psychopath while nearby residents watched but did nothing to help.

Cast
 Raul Julia as Detective Nick Rodriguez
 John P. Ryan as Detective Dave Lambert
 Phillip Clark as Detective Johnny Bellon
 Lucie Arnaz as Judy
 Ed Asner as Peter Singleton
 Cloris Leachman as Mrs. Singleton
 Art Carney as Mr. Jacobs
 Diahann Carroll as Betty May
 Kate Jackson as Carol
 Tina Louise as Hilda Murray
 Nancy Walker as Mrs. Jacobs
 Eric Braeden as Kosinsky
 Thelma Houston as Lady Wing Ding
 Dimitra Arliss as Mrs. Kosinsky
 Bert Freed as Detective Ross
 Allyn Ann McLerie as Alice Whitmore
 Tony Dow as Joey
 Sally Kirkland as Mary
 Belinda Balaski as Jenny Storm
 Helen Hunt as Teila
 Joan Goodfellow as Mrs. Daniels
 Les Lannom as Mr. Daniels

Notes

External links

1975 films
1975 television films
American television films
Films directed by Richard T. Heffron
Films scored by Gil Mellé
Films set in New York City
Films with screenplays by Stirling Silliphant
Television films based on actual events
1970s English-language films